Marko Milinković (born 16 April 1988) is a Serbian footballer who plays as a left midfielder.

Career
From July 2007 until December 2010, he played for Košice. In February 2011, Milinković signed a contract with Slovan Bratislava. In May 2016 he signed with Gençlerbirliği S.K.

On 3 September 2021, Alashkert announced the signing of Milinković.

International
Milinković was a member of the Serbia national under-21 football team. He debuted against Denmark at the Play-off for Final Tournament 2009 EURO U-21 Championship on 11 October 2008. In second leg against Denmark he scored his first goal. Milinković played first half against Belarus at the 2009 EURO U-21 Championship.
On 12 August 2009, Marko made his senior international debut in a 3–1 away win against South Africa in a friendly.

Personal life
His father Duško Milinković was also a footballer, playing for Yugoslavia at the 1988 Summer Olympics.

Career statistics

Club

International

Honours
Košice
Slovak Cup (1): 2008–09

Slovan
Fortuna Liga (3): 2010–11, 2012–13, 2013–14
Slovak Cup (2): 2010–11, 2012–13
Slovak Super Cup (1): 2014

Alashkert
Armenian Supercup (1): 2021

References

External links
 Slovan Bratislava profile 
 
 

1988 births
Living people
Serbian footballers
Serbia international footballers
FK Borac Čačak players
FC VSS Košice players
ŠK Slovan Bratislava players
Gençlerbirliği S.K. footballers
Eskişehirspor footballers
Slovak Super Liga players
Süper Lig players
TFF First League players
Association football wingers
Expatriate footballers in Slovakia
Expatriate footballers in Turkey
Serbian expatriate footballers
Serbia under-21 international footballers
Serbian expatriate sportspeople in Slovakia
Serbian expatriate sportspeople in Turkey